Arlington Horse Racing is a horse racing arcade game released by Strata / Incredible Technologies in 1990, based on the Arlington Park race track.

Summary

The player inserts coins into the slots, and then bet on the horses. When he is finished betting, press the start race button to see the horse run the track. The game then pays off any winning bids in credits, and then starts over. The game features the voice of Arlington's famous announcer Phil Georgeff.

References

External links
 Arlington Horse Racing at Arcade History
 

1990 video games
Arcade video games
Horse racing video games
Video games developed in the United States